Events in the year 1575 in Norway.

Incumbents
Monarch: Frederick II

Events

Arts and literature

Births

Deaths

9 April – Absalon Pederssøn Beyer, clergyman, writer, historian (born c. 1528).

See also

References